John Larry Nichols (born July 6, 1942) is the co-founder and former chairman, president, and chief executive officer of Devon Energy.

Nichols is a member of the board of directors of Baker Hughes and Sonic Drive-In.

Early life and education
In 1960, Nichols graduated from Casady School in Oklahoma City. In 1964, he received a B.A. in Geology from Princeton University. In 1967, he received a JD from University of Michigan Law School.

Career
After graduating, he served as a law clerk to both Associate Justice Tom C. Clark and Chief Justice Earl Warren of the Supreme Court of the United States. He also worked for William Rehnquist when Rehnquist was the United States Assistant Attorney General.

In 1971, along with his father, John Nichols, an oilman, J. Larry Nichols co-founded Devon Energy. He served as chief executive officer of the company from 1980 to 2010, was president from 1976 until 2003, was chairman from 2000 to 2012, and was executive chairman from 2013 to 2016.

In 2001, he was inducted into the Oklahoma Hall of Fame.

Personal life
In 1972, Nichols married Polly. They have 2 children: a daughter, Sally, and a son, Tyler.

Politics
Nichols is a Republican.

In the third quarter of 2014, just before the midterm elections, Nichols made a $136,000 contribution to the Republican "Targeted State Victory" committee.

In 2015, Nichols agreed to lead the energy steering committee of Florida Senator Marco Rubio and made a $50,000 contribution to the political action committee supporting Rubio. Nichols stated that "excessive regulation squashes" energy innovation.

Nichols has contributed to Oklahoma Strong, the political action committee supporting Scott Pruitt.

Philanthropy
Nichols is the namesake of the J. Larry Nichols Community Foundation Scholar Award by the Oklahoma City Community Foundation.

See also 
 List of law clerks of the Supreme Court of the United States (Chief Justice)
 List of law clerks of the Supreme Court of the United States (Seat 10)

References

Further reading
 Burke, Robert. Deals, Deals, and More Deals: The Life of John W. Nichols. Oklahoma Heritage Association. 2004. .

External links
 Voices of Oklahoma interview with Larry Nichols; March 1, 2012.

1942 births
Businesspeople from Oklahoma City
Law clerks of the Supreme Court of the United States
Lawyers from Oklahoma City
Living people
Princeton University alumni
University of Michigan Law School alumni